Jonathan Glancey,  is an architectural critic and writer who was the architecture and design editor at The Guardian, a position he held from 1997 to February 2012. He previously held the same post at The Independent.   He also has been involved with the architecture magazines Building Design, Architectural Review, The Architect and Blueprint.  He is an honorary fellow of the Royal Institute of British Architects, RIBA.

Following in the footsteps of Ian Nairn he made a series of four films, Outrage Revisited (2010) on the banality of Britain's postwar buildings.

He is a fan of Le Corbusier. Currently he reports on architecture and design for the website BBC Culture.

Education
Glancey attended St Benedict's School in Ealing, London and studied Philosophy, Politics and Economics at Magdalen College, Oxford.

Books by Glancey

New British architecture (London: Thames and Hudson, 1989) 
Pillar Boxes (London: Chatto & Windus, 1989) 
20th Century Architecture: The Structures That Shaped the Century (London: Carlton, 1998) 
The Story of Architecture (London; New York: Dorling Kindersley, 2000) 
London: Bread and Circuses (London: Verso Books, 2001) 
The Train:  A Photographic History (London: Carlton, 2004)  
John Betjeman on Trains (London: Methuen, 2006) 
Spitfire: The Biography, 2006
John Betjeman on Churches (London: Methuen, 2007) 
Tornado: 21st Century Steam (London: Books on Track, 2010) 
Nagaland: A journey to India's forgotten frontier, April 2011
Giants of Steam (London: Atlantic Books, 2012) 
Harrier: The Biography (London: Atlantic Books, 2013) 
Concorde: The Rise and Fall of the Supersonic Airliner (London: Atlantic Books, October 2015) 
What's So Great About the Eiffel Tower? (London: Laurence King Publishing, February 2017) 
Wings Over Water: The Story of the World's Greatest Air Race and the Birth of the Spitfire (London: Atlantic Books, 2020) 
The Journey Matters (London: Atlantic Books, 2019) ISBN 978-1-78649-416-0

References

External links
BBC Culture
Articles at the Guardian
Journalisted – Articles by Jonathan Glancey
– Article by Jonathan Glancey on "Finding Nagaland: India's final frontier"

British architecture writers
Architecture critics
British male journalists
The Guardian journalists
Living people
People educated at St Benedict's School, Ealing
Alumni of Magdalen College, Oxford
Year of birth missing (living people)
The Independent people